Rayma Wilson (August 28, 1910 – June 21, 1985) was an American middle-distance runner. She competed in the women's 800 metres at the 1928 Summer Olympics.

References

External links
 

1910 births
1985 deaths
Athletes (track and field) at the 1928 Summer Olympics
American female middle-distance runners
Olympic track and field athletes of the United States
Place of birth missing
20th-century American women